Leucogonia is a genus of moths of the family Noctuidae. The genus was erected by George Hampson in 1908.

Species
 Leucogonia amarginata Holloway, 1979
 Leucogonia cosmopis Lower, 1897
 Leucogonia ekeikei Bethune-Baker, 1906
 Leucogonia kebeensis Bethune-Baker, 1906

References

Agaristinae